Loxokalypodidae is a family of Entoprocta belonging to the order Solitaria.

Genera:
 Loxokalypus Emschermann, 1972

References

Entoprocta